Primordial qigong is a form of qigong purportedly developed by the Taoist sage Chang San Feng.

Donald Rubbo, a lineage holder of the primordial qigong (from Master Zhu Hui) has written in Primordial Qigong, A Gem from the Treasure Chest of Taoist Mystical Qigong, "The Primordial Qigong system reflects the wisdom of the ancient Taoist sages and their theory of the birth of the universe. Primordial qigong is a three-dimensional physical mandala, and as such it encompasses all of the primary aspects of Taoist philosophy: the concepts of yin yang, the trinity (heaven, earth and man), the Five Element Wu Xing theory of Traditional Chinese Medicine, the I Ching, the Ba gua and the mystical aspects of numbers."

The Primordial qigong system reflects the Taoist theory of the birth of the universe. These concepts were based on their observations of nature, their perception of the alternating balance of energy of the primal forces (yin yang) and the integral relationship between heaven, humanity and earth. The Taoist sages postulated that from the pre-birth state of WuJi (Original Emptiness) came the primal spark and from the primal spark, Taiji (Supreme Ultimate) was born. From Taiji, yin yang manifested as opposing forces.

Primordial qigong is also known as Tai Chi for Liberation (John P. Milton), Tai Chi for Enlightenment (Michael Winn) and Enlightenment Qigong (Andrew Fretwell).

The Ba gua is integrated into the primordial qigong form: the eight trigrams are represented by the placement of the body in the Center facing the cardinal directions and awareness of the intercardinal directions: northeast, southeast, northwest and southwest, as one turns both counter-clockwise and clockwise throughout the form.

Roger Jahnke has written in The Healing Promise of Qi, quoting Dr. Chen: "The form called Primordial Qigong [Wuji Qigong] reverses time to reconnect the practitioner with the past and with their prebirth state to alter the course of the future. I practiced this Qigong faithfully and took some herbal formulas and, over some time, completely recovered from cancer."

History 
Wuji (philosophy) Gung (primordial qigong) is thought to have been developed by Zhang San Feng prior to his developing Tai Chi Chuan (Taijiquan).

Primordial qigong was brought to the United States by lineage holder Master Zhu Hui, who allegedly healed himself of hepatocirrhosis by practicing this form daily. Master Zhu Hui was taught primordial qigong by Master Li Tong.

Donald Rubbo and Michael Winn both learned the form from Zhu Hui, as did Roger Jahnke. John P. Milton is another notable teacher of primordial qigong, who reports having learned the form at Wudang mountain in China.

See also

 Baguazhang
 Dantian
 I Ching
 Qigong
 Silk reeling
 Taijiquan
 Traditional Chinese medicine
 Xingyiquan
 Zhan zhuang
 Zhang Sanfeng

References

Chinese martial arts
Chinese words and phrases
Meditation
Qigong
Taoist practices